This Is Hell may refer to:

 This Is Hell (band), a Long Island, New York-based hardcore punk band
 This Is Hell (This Is Hell album), the first album by the above band
 This Is Hell Demo, the first demo by the above band
 This Is Hell (Dimension Zero album), the second album by Swedish melodic death metal band Dimension Zero
 This Is Hell!, a 4-hour weekly news radio show from Chicago
 "Fuck Armageddon...This Is Hell", a song from Bad Religion's debut record, How Could Hell Be Any Worse?